Aerovias de Mexico Contigo S.A. de C.V. operating as Aeroméxico Contigo (Aeroméxico with you) was a Grupo Aeroméxico "airline within an airline" operating select US and Mexican routes from its hubs at Guadalajara and Mexico City. Their fleet consists of all-economy Boeing 737-800 aircraft, allowing them to compete with low-cost airlines, such as Volaris. It also serves as a feeder airline for mainline Aeroméxico and Aeroméxico Connect on the most popular and busiest routes.

History

2013
On 17 June 2013, Grupo Aeroméxico announced that it would launch a new subsidiary to help with their busiest international and domestic routes. The airline started with four wet-leased Boeing 737-800 aircraft. Their inaugural flight was on 1 October 2013 on the Guadalajara-Los Angeles route.

2015
In 2015, Contigo launched flights to LA/Ontario, Fresno, and several other smaller, secondary airports in Northern California.

2016 – present
Starting in 2016, to compete against other Mexican low-cost airlines, Contigo began eliminating free hot meals and checked baggage. Contigo's fares and costs tend to be significantly lower than those of mainline Aeroméxico, often rivaling those of Volaris and Interjet Airlines.

Destinations
Cancun - Cancún International Airport
Chicago - Chicago O’Hare International Airport
Culiacán - Bachigualato Federal International Airport
Fresno - Fresno Yosemite International Airport
Guadalajara - Don Miguel Hidalgo y Costilla International Airport
León/Guanajuato - Del Bajio International Airport
Los Angeles - Los Angeles International Airport
Mexicali - General Rodolfo Sánchez Taboada International Airport
Mexico City - Benito Juárez International Airport
Morelia - General Francisco J. Mujica International Airport
Ontario - LA/Ontario International Airport
Sacramento - Sacramento Metropolitan Airport
San Francisco - San Francisco International Airport
San Jose - Norman Y. Mineta San Jose International Airport
Tijuana - General Abelardo L. Rodríguez International Airport

Fleet

The Aeromexico "Contigo" fleet consisted of several Boeing 737-800s all configured with 186 seats in a single Y class (Clase Turista), offering 6 front "Economy Plus" rows and 168 standard economy seats. These aircraft were not equipped with wifi antennas, therefore, onboard entertainment available was reading material on every seat (Aeromexico's magazine "Aire") and overhead service unit screens every 3 to 4 rows displaying an array of movies throughout the flights. On the exterior, they were all painted with the "Contigo" decal to differentiate from the mainline B737-800s. Although Aeromexico still has a mix of newer B737-800s and B737 MAX 8s configured with a single Economy class, they are all now part of Aeromexico's mainline product, so as of August 2022, all the B737-800s that once flew for Aeromexico Contigo, have all been returned to their lessor.

References

External links

Website

Aeroméxico
Airlines established in 2013
Mexican companies established in 2013